The Open Novotel Perrier was a golf tournament held in France that was played between 1994 and 1998. It was an unofficial money event on the European Tour and was a pairs tournament played in a combination of fourball, foursome and greensome formats.

Winners

References

External links
Coverage on the European Tour's official site

Former European Tour events
Defunct golf tournaments in France